This is a list of parks in Omaha, Nebraska. It includes cemeteries and golf courses. Most parks in Omaha are governed by the City of Omaha Parks and Recreation Department.

History
In 1854 Alfred D. Jones drew four parks on the original map of Omaha City. They were called Jefferson Square, which was paved over by I-480; Washington Park, which is where the Paxton Block currently sits at North 16th and Farnam Streets; Capitol Square, where Omaha Central High School is now located, and; an unnamed tract overlooking the river with Davenport Street on the north, Jackson Street on the south, North 8th on the east and North 9th Street on the west. Jefferson Square lasted until 1969, when it was razed to make way for a new interstate in downtown Omaha. The riverfront from the interstate south to the headquarters of ConAgra Foods is now the Heartland of America Park.

Hanscom Park became Omaha's first park. Miller, Fontenelle, Elmwood and Riverview were Omaha's largest parks in 1920. (Riverview Park Zoo eventually became Henry Doorly Zoo.) Other parks in the system that year were Bemis, Deer, Kountze Park, Curtis Turner, Harold Gifford, Mercer, Jefferson Square, Hixenbaugh, Burt playground, Bluff View, Spring Lake, Highland, McKinley, Clear View and Morton.

Omaha's boulevard system was designed to be part of the parks system in 1889 by renowned landscape architect Horace Cleveland. The Omaha Park and Boulevard System was listed on the National Register of Historic Places in 2013.

Administration
The Department of Parks, Recreation, and Public Property is the City of Omaha's agency responsible for administering public parks.

Current parks

See also

 List of cemeteries in Omaha
 Culture in Omaha
 Sports in Omaha

References

External links 
 Parks in Omaha – info about parks and public places in Omaha

 
Omaha
Omaha, Nebraska-related lists